Philippe Deane Gigantès (August 16, 1923 – December 9, 2004) was a veteran of the Second World War, journalist, war correspondent, POW of the Korean War, author, television commentator, Greek minister of culture, and Canadian senator.

War and journalism
Gigantès served in the British Royal Navy during the Second World War. After the war, he became a journalist, working for the London Observer, in Greece, North Africa, and South Asia, from 1946 to 1961.

Whilst covering the Korean War he was taken prisoner, and spent 33 months in a North Korean prison camp. During this time he was interned with George Blake. After his release he wrote the book I was a Captive in Korea and returned to his career in journalism. He became the Washington correspondent for the London Observer and The Globe and Mail.

From 1965 to the 1970s, he was a journalist in Canada. During the 1970s he was speech writer and top aide to Canadian Prime Minister Pierre Trudeau.

Greek Minister of Culture

He worked as a United Nations official. In 1964 he was appointed to the post of associate Greek Minister of Culture, serving until 1965. He later resumed his career in the media as a television commentator from 1965 to 1970s.

Academic career and Canadian civil servant

From 1965 to 1968 completed his Bachelor of Arts, Master and PhD at the University of Toronto.

After his graduation he served as Dean of Arts at Bishop's University and Dean of Arts and Science at University of Lethbridge.

In the 1970s he served with the Official Languages Commission and the Treasury Board.

Canadian Senator

In 1980 he ran for MP in the Canadian riding of Broadview-Greenwood, but was defeated by Bob Rae. In 1984 while working as an editorialist at the Montreal Gazette he was appointed to the Senate of Canada by Pierre Trudeau, for whom he had worked between 1978 and 1980 as a researcher then head of the Liberal Caucus Research Office. He served in the Senate until his 75th birthday in 1998.

While in the Senate he served on many committees but was particularly proud of his work as chair of an adhoc committee on the future of work. His report of this work was published by Parliament under the title Only Work Works and in French under the title "Il n'y a que le Travail qui Vaille.

Electoral record

Author
He was the author of 15 books including I Should Have Died, Is the Free Trade Deal Really for You? (1988) and Power and Greed: A Short History of the World (2002).

In his book Nice Work: The Continuing Scandal of Canada's Senate, journalist and author Claire Hoy wrote that Gigantes, during a filibuster in the Senate, read one of his books into the record; another senator suggested that he did this to get the work translated into French for free by parliamentary staff responsible for Hansard.

Death
Gigantès died on December 9, 2004 of prostate cancer in Montreal. He left behind his wife Sylvie, three daughters Eleni, Claire and Eve Marie, two grandsons and a granddaughter. His ashes were scattered in the waters of the Mediterranean Sea near Kefalonia, Greece.

References

External links
 

1923 births
2004 deaths
Canadian senators from Quebec
Deaths from prostate cancer
Candidates in the 1980 Canadian federal election
Liberal Party of Canada senators
Politicians from Montreal
Recipients of the Order of the Phoenix (Greece)
University of Toronto alumni
Liberal Party of Canada candidates for the Canadian House of Commons
Greek emigrants to Canada